Wentworth North was a federal electoral district represented in the House of Commons of Canada from 1867 to 1896. It was located near the city of Hamilton in the province of Ontario. It was created by the British North America Act of 1867.  The "North Riding of Wentworth" consisted of the Townships of Beverley, Flamborough East and Flamborough West, and the Town of Dundas.

The electoral district was abolished in 1892 when it was merged into Wentworth North and Brant riding.

Electoral history

|-
  
|Liberal
|James McMonies
|align="right"|1,154 
 
|Unknown
|Alexander Brown
|align="right"|1,093
|}

|-
  
|Liberal
|BAIN, Thomas
|align="right"| 1,145 
 
|Unknown
| MCKECHNIE, R. 
|align="right"| 1,040  
|}

|-
  
|Liberal
|BAIN, Thomas
|align="right"| acclaimed   
|}

|-
  
|Liberal
|BAIN, Thomas
|align="right"|1,343 
 
|Unknown
|STOCK, Thos.
|align="right"| 1,237   
|}

|-
  
|Liberal
|BAIN, Thomas
|align="right"| 1,295 
 
|Unknown
| MCKECHNIE, Robt. Jr. 
|align="right"|1,292   
|}

|-
  
|Liberal
|BAIN, Thomas
|align="right"|1,639 
  
|Conservative
|TOWNSEND, T.B.
|align="right"| 1,513   
|}

|-
  
|Liberal
|BAIN, Thomas
|align="right"|1,517 
  
|Conservative
| WARDELL, Alex R.
|align="right"| 1,317   
|}

See also 

 List of Canadian federal electoral districts
 Past Canadian electoral districts

External links 

 Website of the Parliament of Canada

Former federal electoral districts of Ontario